Scymnus magnomaculatus, is a species of beetle found in the family Coccinellidae. It is found in Europe.

References 

Beetles of Europe